Biofuelwatch is a non-governmental environmental organization based in the United Kingdom and the United States, which works to raise awareness of the negative impacts of industrial biofuels and bioenergy. It opposes the expansion of industrial monocultures driven by demand for bioenergy, and instead advocates for food sovereignty, agroecological farming practices, ecosystem and biodiversity protection and human rights.

In the UK,it has active campaigns against bioliquid and biomass power stations and the subsidies (Renewable Obligation Certificates) available for those.  In the US, Biofuelwatch works closely with network of groups and campaigners against industrial biomass developments and policies.  Internationally, the organisation works with a variety of groups and networks and is European Focal Point of the Global Forest Coalition.  A lot of Biofuelwatch's recent work has focused on providing a critical perspective on biochar as well. It also campaigns against market based solutions to climate change, especially the inclusion of soil and forest carbon offsets.

Founders of Biofuelwatch 
Almuth Ernsting helped to found the organisation, Biofuelwatch in 2006. She has researched and published various reports on the central issues to the organization, such as bioenergy, climate, social and biodiversity impacts of biofuels and wood-based biomass.  Rachel Smolker is a co-director of Biofuelwatch and an organizer at Engine Justice Network. She is the daughter of one of the founders of Environmental Defense Fund and holds a Ph.D. in ecology/biology from the University of Michigan.

Aims of Biofuelwatch 

 Biofuelwatch acts as an advocate towards educating the public of the environmental, climate, social and public health implications of bio energy and bio-based products. They also allow the public to voice their concerns over these same topics.
 Promote energy policies and investments of renewable energy, that result to greenhouse gas reduction, protect the environment and basic human rights
 Promote environment decision making related to bio-energy and bio-based products such as land use, social justice, active citizenship and public health

Ideology 
Bio fuels are commonly viewed as a suitable alternative to non-renewable energy and Biofuelwatch works towards bringing light to risks associated with this belief. Another benefit is that when biofuels are burned they release {{CO2}}(carbon dioxide) which had been used in their production. This is a food source for plants, which they use during the process of photosynthesis. This in turn increases the biomass' (the plants needed to make biofuel) growth. Conversely, Biofuelwatch educates the public about biofuels' harm to the planet. That is biofuels are made out of food crops; these food crops are traded on international markets. When there is an increase in the production of biofuels globally, the price of these crops will increase. Food is less accessible because of the increase in price (e.g., Tortilla Crisis) and the crops that are bought are being used to make fuel and not used for human consumption. The second argument against biofuels is that the sheer amount of crops needed to produce the amount of biofuel demanded by the world is high. This leads to heavy dependence on pesticides, fertilizers, and energy to produce the crops. These three factors contribute heavily to pollution.

"Agro-fuel" 
Biofuel is a biomass that is converted into a liquid that can be used to power motorized vehicles. The main source of biomass that can be used for vehicle fuels is food crops. These crops are cultivated using modern, mechanized agriculture. Crop-based biofuels (e.g., ethanol: produced from sugar cane or corn) have globally increased in production by 75% during the 2000-2006 period. In particular, the United States produces 50 billion liters of corn based ethanol per year. This production of corn based ethanol consumes a third of all planted corn.

Biofuelwatch has argued that the term "Biofuel" is misleading. The prefix "Bio" comes from "life". This implies that the fuel comes from life or is pro-life. Biofuelwatch argues that we need to find a term that translates in every language to a more true definition of what biofuel really is. They came up with the term "Agro-fuel", the prefix "agro" comes from agriculture. They believe this is fitting because the production of biofuels taint land and water, which are directly related to agriculture. This term "agro-fuel" is pejoratively based.

Biofuelwatch and Protests 
Biofuelwatch has been known to join forces with various other organizations with similar views towards the biomass and biofuel industry in attempts to sway public opinion on public policies. Through actions such as public protests, demonstrations and press statements regarding their views on governments positions towards biofuels and the biofuel industry.

Notable Protests 
 22 April 2020, Virtual; An online protest against the burning of biomass by one of the UK's largest power stations, Drax
 20 April 2016, London, England; Protest during the Drax Annual General Meeting 
 25 June 2012; African Land Summit protest. Joined with ActionAid and Friends of the Earth
 19 April 2012; Edinburgh, Scotland, outside the Scottish Parliament building. Joined with Friends of the World (Scotland), No Leith Biomass Campaign and the Grangemouth Community Council
 22–23 October 2011; London, England. Action Against Agrofuel Campaign
 14 September 2011; Edinburgh, Scotland. Joined in the Moving Planet protest against fossil fuels and large-scale biomass plans.
 16 May 2011; Grangemouth, Scotland. Action Against Agrofuel protest
 24 February 2011; Holyrood, Edinburgh, Scotland. No Leith Biomass protest
 23 August 2010; Grangemouth, Scotland. Action Against Agrofuel protest

Notable Demonstrations 
 25 September 2010; Portland, Oregon, USA. Demonstration against W4B's palm oil plans
 10 August 2010; Bristol, England. Demonstration during the W4B public inquiry
 11 May 2010; Portland, Oregon, USA. Demonstration during the No Oil Palm Energy (NOPE) rally

Biofuelwatch Campaigns

#AxeDrax Campaign 

The #AxeDrax Campaign is a UK based campaign based around the UK company Drax Group and the Drax power station. The aim of the #AxeDrax Campaign aims to bring public awareness towards Drax and their  emissions in the UK.

The UK Government announced in 2015 that they will begin to phase-out coal burning power stations leading to a complete banning of coal burning power stations by 2025. To accompany this phase out, the UK government issued 470 million pounds to Drax to begin its conversion from coal to wood pellets, and protestors of Drax also claim that Drax receives more than 1 million pounds in subsidies per day to add to the wood pellets conversion efforts.

The #AxeDrax Campaign have received a response from the UK Department of Energy and Climate Change

Biofuelwatch played a role in the social media campaign, #AxeDrax on media outlets such as Twitter, where outlets such as the Ecologist have been promoting the demonstrations and encouraging people to join in.

Campaign to end UK subsidies for biomass electricity
As of 21 December 2017, the government of UK declared its increase in bioenergy production by almost 23 percent compared the year 2016, due to increased availability at Drax. Biofuelwatch campaigns to enlighten the public on the biodiversity losses and climatic implications of such an increase in bioenergy productions and propose a subsidy reformation to allow proper allocation of resources to other renewable sources of energy: wind, solar and tidal.

UK Local Campaigns against Biofuel and Biomass Power stations

This campaign aims at offering advice and support to the local community concerned about "proposed and existing biomass power stations in the UK". Some local groups they supported include campaigners in West Thurrock, Androver, Milford Haven, and Norwich.

Geoengineering

Biofuelwatch has released a number of Reports and Briefings providing detail on some of the effects of using geoengineering technologies to cope with climate change. Rachel Smolker, suggests " geoengineering research is being actively promoted by vested interests."

Biotechnology for Biofuels

Biotechnology for Biofuels refers to research on biofuels derived from lignocellulose and algae. In partnership with Friends of the Earth U.S., the organization released the report: "Microalgae Biofuels: Myths and Risks".
Various reports have been released, that encompass the use of genetically engineered organisms in different contexts and the effects of the endeavor to the general public.

Genetically Engineered Trees Campaign (GE Trees) 

The Genetically Engineered Trees Campaign (GE Trees Campaign) pertains to companies that genetically engineer trees in attempts to increase resistance to certain pests, diseases, environmental conditions, and herbicide tolerance, or the alteration of lignin levels in order to reduce pulping costs of their tree plantations. The GE trees campaign "supports the call for a global ban on the testing and commercial deployment of GE trees" The campaign also tells of risks involved with the commercialization of genetically engineered trees.

See also
Food vs. fuel
Issues relating to biofuels
Climate change
Sustainability
Biotechnology

Further listening

External links
Biofuelwatch official website
Biofuelwatch's Yahoo group

References 

Bioenergy in the United Kingdom
Bioenergy organizations
Biofuels
Environmental organisations based in the United Kingdom
Environmental organizations based in the United States
International environmental organizations